Château de Gaujacq is a château in Landes, Nouvelle-Aquitaine, France. It dates to 1686 and was built in the Italian renaissance style.

External links
Official website (French)

Châteaux in Landes (department)
Houses completed in 1686
Renaissance architecture in France
1686 establishments in France